Vanyshevo (Wanış) is a rural locality (a village) in Krasnokholmsky Selsoviet, Kaltasinsky District, Bashkortostan, Russia. The population was 37 as of 2010. There are 3 streets.

Geography 
Vanyshevo is located 13 km southeast of Kaltasy (the district's administrative centre) by road. Sultanayevo is the nearest rural locality.

References 

Rural localities in Kaltasinsky District